Tallula is a village in Menard County, Illinois, United States. It was founded in 1857 by William G. Greene. The population was 434 at the 2020 census, down from 488 in 2010. It is part of the Springfield, Illinois Metropolitan Statistical Area.

History 
William G. Greene, J. G. Greene, Richard Yates, T. Baker, and W. G. Spears laid out Tallula in late 1857. The name of "Tallula" was said to be an Indian word. The History of Menard & Mason Counties, Illinois credits Spears with the name, and notes that it was said to mean "dropping water", but nothing in the area is especially related to dropping water; the county tourist bureau claims that William G. Greene named the town, that it means "trickling water", and that it is related to "abundant springs in the area".

Tallula was incorporated as a village under Illinois' general municipal law in 1871 or 1872.  William Greene and physician J. F. Wilson established the local bank in May 1877.

Geography
Tallula is located in southwestern Menard County at  (39.944197, -89.937610).  It is at the center of Tallula Precinct. Illinois Route 123 passes through the southeast side of the village, leading northeast  to Petersburg, the county seat, and south  to Illinois Route 125 between Pleasant Plains and Ashland.

The village is drained to the north by a tributary of Clary Creek, a north-flowing tributary of the Sangamon River and part of the Illinois River watershed.

Demographics

As of the census of 2000, there were 638 people, 238 households, and 175 families residing in the village. The racial makeup of the village was 99.06% White, 0.16% Native American, and 0.78% from two or more races. Hispanic or Latino of any race were 0.63% of the population.

There were 238 households, out of which 37.4% had children under the age of 18 living with them, 60.1% were married couples living together, 9.2% had a female householder with no husband present, and 26.1% were non-families. 21.8% of all households were made up of individuals, and 10.5% had someone living alone who was 65 years of age or older. The average household size was 2.68 and the average family size was 3.07.

In the village, the population was spread out, with 28.8% under the age of 18, 7.5% from 18 to 24, 29.3% from 25 to 44, 21.9% from 45 to 64, and 12.4% who were 65 years of age or older. The median age was 35 years. For every 100 females, there were 101.3 males. For every 100 females age 18 and over, there were 97.4 males.

The median income for a household in the village was $38,269, and the median income for a family was $38,864. Males had a median income of $31,250 versus $19,750 for females. The per capita income for the village was $16,088. About 12.6% of families and 18.9% of the population were below the poverty line, including 30.0% of those under age 18 and 3.6% of those age 65 or over.

References

Populated places established in 1857
Populated places established in the 1870s
Villages in Menard County, Illinois
Villages in Illinois
Springfield metropolitan area, Illinois
1857 establishments in Illinois